Northern Thebaid, is the poetic name of the northern Russian lands surrounding Vologda and Belozersk, appeared as a comparison with the Egyptian area Thebaid - well-known settling place of early Christian monks and hermits.

Historically Thebaid is the region of Upper Egypt, the term derives from the Greek name of its capital Thebes.

The term was coined by an orthodox writer Andrei Muravyov in his book of reflections about a pilgrimage to holy places of Vologda and Belozersk, which he named "Russian Thebaid in the North" (1855).

Here in this quiet retreat, where suddenly I found my summer shelter under a hospitable roof of a hospitable owner. Here I am undertaking a description of our native Thebaid which I have just visited around Vologda and Belozersk. Secular people are unlikely to know it, whereas many people have heard about the Thebaid of Egypt and have read in paterikon about the exploits of the great Greek Fathers, who lighted up in the harsh deserts of the Scetis and the Palestine... In a space of more than 500 miles from the Lavra to Beloozero and further, it was like one continuous area studded with hermitages and desert hermits, which lay people were then to settle and build their homes where there were only cells. St. Sergius is the head of all, stands on the southern edge of this wonderful area and sends pupils and companions into the Thebaid, and St. Cyril, on the other side of the area accepts newcomers....

Sometimes Northern Thebaid is more narrowly referred to as an extensive neighborhood of the St. Cyril-Belozersk Monastery. The term "Northern Thebaid" is also used as a brand, similar to the concept of the Russian North.

Footnotes 

Geography of Vologda Oblast